Phereoeca allutella, the household case-bearing moth, belongs to the subfamily Tineinae of the fungus moth family (Tineidae). It was first described by Hans Rebel in 1892. It is an occasional pest of furs, flannel and similar materials, and has been inadvertently introduced to many places it is not originally native to.

Description
The wingspan is 10–13 mm for females and 7–9 mm for males. Adults are grey with one to four black spots on the forewings, and a fringe of scales along the posterior margin of the hindwings. When at rest, the wings are held tented over the body.

In the male genitals, the clasper's harpe tapers from the base, but is generally slender, with a conspicuous swelling on the basal third of the costal part which distinguishes this species. The gnathos is formed by two slim and curved parts; the uncus is likewise long and slim; it abruptly truncates at the end. The vinculum is broad, with a large slender saccus; the tegumen is elongated. The anellus is generally not sclerotized (hardened), and the aedeagus is somewhat more robust than the other organs, though not large, curves slightly, and is somewhat expanded near the tip. In the female genitals, the ostium is long and situated above two sclerotized horn-like swellings. The antrum is strongly sclerotized, with the ductus seminalis attaching slightly before it. The ductus bursae is delicate, with no conspicuous ornaments or structures, as is the bursa copulatrix; a signum is lacking.

Distribution and ecology
It has been recorded from Panama, the Canary Islands and Madeira, Sierra Leone and perhaps elsewhere in Africa, the Seychelles, India, Java, and the Hawaiian Islands, Samoa and the Marquesas Islands (at least on Hiva Oa) in the Pacific. A record from Sri Lanka is more dubious; these individuals were described as a distinct species (Tinea pachyspila), but seem to be either P. allutella or the closely related and very similar plaster bagworm (P. uterella), which is sometimes also referred as "household casebearer".

The larvae feed on a variety of dead materials, including dead insects and animal hair. Feeding takes place from within a case. These larval and pupal cases have been found on the outside walls and inside of non-air-conditioned buildings and are most abundant under spiderwebs, in bathrooms and bedrooms. Possibly, the species may be associated with mammals other than man. The larval case of this species is flat, spindle shaped in outline, open at both ends, silk lined inside, and covered with sand and other small particles outside. It is constructed by the first-instar larva soon after hatching and is enlarged by each successive instar, and after special modification, is used for pupation. Fully formed cases are 8–13 mm long and 3–5 mm wide.

Footnotes

References
  (1986). "Pyralidae and Microlepidoptera of the Marquesas Archipelago". Smithsonian Contributions to Zoology. 416: 1–485.
  (2011). Global Taxonomic Database of Tineidae (Lepidoptera). Retrieved December 23, 2011.

External links

Life History and Behavior of the Case-Bearer Phereoeca allutella (Lepidoptera: Tineidae)

Tineidae
Moths of Seychelles
Moths of Europe
Moths described in 1892